The 2017–18 Minerva Punjab F.C. season is the 2nd season of in the I-League which is India's top football league. They finished the season as I-League Champions becoming the first team from North India to win the I-League since its inception.

Kit
Supplier: Astro / Sponsor: Apollo Tyres

Coaching staff

As of 25 November 2017.

Squad information

First-team squad

Competitions

Overview

I-League

League table

Result summary

Results by match

Matches

Super Cup

Minerva Punjab FC entered the competition in Round of 16 and were drawn against Jamshedpur. However, they lost in the first game in penalty shootouts, concluding the season for I-League champions.

Awards

Player

References

See also
 2017–18 in Indian football
 2017–18 I-League

2017–18 I-League by team
RoundGlass Punjab FC seasons